The Battle of the Bahamas or the Battle of Nassau may refer to one of several military actions in and around the town of Nassau, on the island of New Providence in The Bahamas:
 Raid on Charles Town, a 1684 Spanish Raid
 Raid on Nassau, a 1703 Franco-Spanish raid during the War of the Spanish Succession
 Raid on Nassau (1720), a Spanish expedition against Nassau during the War of the Quadruple Alliance
 Battle of Nassau, a 1776 American raid during the American War of Independence
 Capture of the Bahamas (1782), the capture of islands by Spanish forces under Juan de Cagigal during the American War of Independence
 Capture of the Bahamas (1783), their recapture by American Loyalist forces during the American War of Independence

See also
 Nassau (disambiguation)